Melati Daeva Oktavianti (born 26 October 1994) is an Indonesian doubles specialist badminton player affiliated with Djarum club since 2008. She was the 2019 Southeast Asian Games gold medalist in the mixed doubles with Praveen Jordan, and 2012 World Junior mixed doubles champion partnered with Edi Subaktiar. Oktavianti and Subaktiar partnership were also a former world junior number 1.

Oktavianti and her partner, Jordan, won the historical All England Open in 2020. The duo reached a career high of world number 4 in March 2020. Oktavianti competed at the 2020 Summer Olympics.

Career

Junior career 
Oktavianti won four titles at the junior tournament, two girls doubles titles at the German Junior and Indonesia Junior International with Rosyita Eka Putri Sari, and two mixed doubles titles at the Dutch Junior and Indonesia Junior International with Edi Subaktiar.

Senior career 
In 2012, Oktavianti and Edi Subaktiar won their first senior title at the Banuinvest International.

In 2013, Oktavianti and Rosyita Eka Putri Sari lost at the finals of Maldives International.

In March 2014, Oktavianti and her new partner in women's doubles Melvira Oklamona lost at the finals of Vietnam International. In April, Oktavianti and Subaktiar reached their first Grand Prix event at the New Zealand Open Grand Prix, but lost to fellow Indonesian pair Alfian Eko Prasetya and Annisa Saufika. In August, Oktavianti and her new mixed doubles partner Ronald Alexander won the Indonesia International.

In February 2015, Oktavianti and Ronald lost at the finals of Austrian Open. In October, they won the Chinese Taipei Masters Grand Prix defeating Taiwanese pair Chang Ko-chi and Chang Hsin-tien.

In September 2016, Oktavianti and Ronald won the Indonesian Masters Grand Prix Gold beating Malaysian pair Tan Kian Meng and Lai Pei Jing.

In September 2017, Oktavianti made new mixed doubles partnership with Alfian Eko Prasetya and won Vietnam Open Grand Prix defeating fellow Indonesian pair Riky Widianto and Masita Mahmudin.

2018–2019 
After the retirement of Debby Susanto,  Praveen Jordan was paired with Oktavianti. They lost to Chinese pair Zheng Siwei and Huang Yaqiong in the second round of the Malaysia Masters. They then became runners-up at the 2018 India Open. They finished the season ranked as world  number 15.

In 2019, Oktavianti and Jordan lost again twice in a row at the India Open from Chinese pair Wang Yilyu and Huang Dongping. In May, they lost at the New Zealand Open from Malaysian pair Chan Peng Soon and Goh Liu Ying. In June, they reached third finals of the year at the Australian Open but lost to Wang and Huang again. In July, they reached the fourth finals at the Japan Open but had to lose from Wang and Huang again. 

In October 2019, they won their first BWF World Tour title at the Denmark Open. The duo upset the current World Champions Zheng Siwei and Huang Yaqiong in the quarter-finals, and defeated world number 2 Wang and Huang in the finals. This victory was their first win over them, bringing their head-to-head record to 1–6. A week later, the duo again overcame the world number 1 Zheng and Huang to claimed the French Open title. Jordan and Oktavianti have continued on the upward track this season, breaking into the top 5 of the BWF world ranking.

2020–2022 
In 2020, Oktavianti and Jordan won All England Open title. They defeated Thai pair Dechapol Puavaranukroh and Sapsiree Taerattanachai in the final.

In January 2021, Oktavianti and Jordan lost at the Yonex Thailand Open from Thai pair Puavaranukroh and Taerattanachai in the final. In July, they competed at the 2020 Summer Olympics, but they were eliminated in the quarter-finals. In November, they lost at the Hylo Open in Germany from Thai pair Puavaranukroh and Taerattanachai in the final.

In 2022, Oktavianti and Jordan played at the Asian Championships in Manila. They reached the semi-finals and won a bronze medal, after the pair had to retire in the middle of the match due to a hip injury suffered by Jordan. Following the injury of Jordan, Djarum decided to give Oktavianti with new partner Muhammad Reza Pahlevi Isfahani and reached the finals of Yogyakarta Indonesia International Series but had to lose to fellow Indonesian and Djarum club pair Dejan Ferdinansyah and Gloria Emanuelle Widjaja.

2023 
In January, Oktavianti and her partner Jordan comeback to court at the Indonesia Masters, but had to lose in the first round from Chinese pair Feng Yanzhe and Huang Dongping.

In March, they competed in the European tour, but unfortunately lost in the second round of German Open from 5th seed Chinese pair Feng Yanzhe and Huang Dongping.

Awards and nominations

Achievements

Asian Championships 
Mixed doubles

Southeast Asian Games 
Mixed doubles

BWF World Junior Championships 
Mixed doubles

BWF World Tour (3 titles, 7 runners-up) 
The BWF World Tour, which was announced on 19 March 2017 and implemented in 2018, is a series of elite badminton tournaments sanctioned by the Badminton World Federation (BWF). The BWF World Tour is divided into levels of World Tour Finals, Super 1000, Super 750, Super 500, Super 300, and the BWF Tour Super 100.

Mixed doubles

BWF Grand Prix (3 titles, 1 runner-up) 
The BWF Grand Prix had two levels, the Grand Prix and Grand Prix Gold. It was a series of badminton tournaments sanctioned by the Badminton World Federation (BWF) and played between 2007 and 2017.

Mixed doubles

  BWF Grand Prix Gold tournament
  BWF Grand Prix tournament

BWF International Challenge/Series (2 titles, 4 runners-up) 
Women's doubles

Mixed doubles

  BWF International Challenge tournament
  BWF International Series tournament

BWF Junior International (4 titles) 
Girls' doubles

Mixed doubles

  BWF Junior International Grand Prix tournament
  BWF Junior International Challenge tournament
  BWF Junior International Series tournament
  BWF Junior Future Series tournament

Performance timeline

National team 
 Junior level

 Senior level

Individual competitions

Junior level 
Girls' doubles

Mixed doubles

Senior level

Women's doubles

Mixed doubles

Record against selected opponents 
Mixed doubles results with Ronald Alexander against World Superseries finalists, World Superseries Finals semifinalists, World Championships semifinalists, and Olympic quarterfinalists:

  Lu Kai & Huang Yaqiong 2–0
  Xu Chen & Ma Jin 0–2
  Joachim Fischer Nielsen & Christinna Pedersen 0–1
  Reginald Lee Chun Hei & Chau Hoi Wah 1–1
  Muhammad Rijal & Vita Marissa 1–1
  Tontowi Ahmad & Liliyana Natsir 0–1
  Ko Sung-hyun & Kim Ha-na 0–2

References 

1994 births
Living people
People from Serang
Sportspeople from Banten
Indonesian female badminton players
Badminton players at the 2020 Summer Olympics
Olympic badminton players of Indonesia
Competitors at the 2019 Southeast Asian Games
Southeast Asian Games gold medalists for Indonesia
Southeast Asian Games silver medalists for Indonesia
Southeast Asian Games medalists in badminton
21st-century Indonesian women
20th-century Indonesian women